The Compline Choir is a nationally acclaimed choral group that chants the Office of Compline every Sunday night, 9:30 P.M. Pacific time, at St. Mark's, Seattle in Seattle, Washington, US. The Office of Compline is made up of sacred music including plainsong and polyphonic compositions, and chanted recitations of the Apostles' Creed and the Lord’s Prayer.

Compline – Last of the Divine Hours
Compline, from the Latin completorium, or completion, is the last of eight monastic services sung throughout the day. These services were defined by the Rule of Saint Benedict.

The Order of Compline at St. Mark’s Cathedral
The Order of Compline consists of short passages from scripture (chapters), psalms, an office hymn, a canticle (Nunc dimittis), a litany, collects and additional prayers.  The liturgy, as sung by the Compline Choir, is based on An Order for Compline, found as an appendix to the 1928 Proposed Book of Common Prayer.

The Compline service at St. Mark’s runs as follows:

  (Listen now)

READER: [spoken][opening prayer/collect; varies]
Orison: CANTOR & CHOIR: [chanted/sung]

SPOKEN
READER: The Lord Almighty grant us a quiet night and a perfect end.
"CHOIR: Amen.

READER: Beloved in Christ, be sober, be vigilant; because your adversary the devil, as a roaring lion, walketh about, seeking whom he may devour, whom resist, steadfast in the faith. [from I Peter 5: 8, 9a]
READER: But thou, O Lord, have mercy upon us.
CHOIR: Thanks be to God.

CHANTED

CANTOR: O God, make speed to save us;
CHOIR: O Lord, make haste to help us.
CANTOR: Glory be to the Father, and to the Son, and to the Holy Ghost;
CHOIR: As it was in the beginning, is now, and ever shall be: world without end. Amen.

CANTOR: Praise ye the Lord;
CHOIR: The Lord's name be praiséd.

 Psalm; varies week to week, sung by the choir

SPOKEN
READER: Thou, O Lord, art in the midst of us, and we are called by thy name. Leave us not, O Lord our God. 
CHOIR: Thanks be to God.

CHANTED
CANTOR: Into thy hands, O Lord, I commend my spirit.
CHOIR: Into thy hands, O Lord, I commend my spirit.
CANTOR: For Thou has redeeméd me, O Lord, Thou God of truth
CHOIR: I commend my spirit.
CANTOR: Glory be to the Father, and to the Son, and to the Holy Ghost.
CHOIR: Into thy hands, O Lord, I commend my spirit.

Hymn; varies week to week, sung by the choir

CHANTED
CANTOR: Keep me as the apple of an eye. 
CHOIR: Hide me under the shadow of thy wings.
CANTOR: Preserve us, O Lord,
CHOIR: While waking, and guard us while sleeping, that awake we may watch with Christ, and asleep we rest in peace.

Nunc Dimittis sung/chanted by the choir
CANTOR: Lord, now let your servant depart in peace
CHOIR: According to your word.

CHOIR: For mine eyes have seen your salvation, which you have prepared before the face of all people to be a light to enlighten the gentiles, and to be the glory of your people Israel. Glory to the Father, and to the Son, and to the Holy Spirit, as it was in the beginning, is now, and will be forever, amen.

CHANTED
CHOIR: Preserve us, O Lord, while waking, and guard us while sleeping, that awake we may watch with Christ, and asleep we may rest in peace.

Apostles' Creed; all stand MONOTONE 
CANTOR: I believe in God 
CHOIR: the Father almighty, maker of heaven and earth; 
And in Jesus Christ, his only son our Lord, who was conceived by the Holy Ghost, born of the Virgin Mary, suffered under Pontius Pilate, was crucified, dead, and buried. He descended into Hell. The third day he rose again from the dead. He ascended into Heaven, and sitteth on the right hand of God the Father almighty. From thence he shall come to judge the quick and the dead.
I believe in the Holy Ghost, the holy catholic church, the communion of saints, the forgiveness of sins, the resurrection of the body, and the life everlasting, amen.

CHANTED
CANTOR: Lord, have mercy upon us.
CHOIR: Christ, have mercy upon us.
CANTOR: Lord, have mercy upon us.

MONOTONE
CANTOR: Our Father 
CHOIR: Who art in heaven, hallowéd be Thy name, Thy kingdom come, Thy will be done, on earth as it is in heaven. Give us this day our daily bread, and forgive us our trespasses, as we forgive those who trespass against us, and lead us not into temptation, but deliver us from evil, Amen.

CHANTED
CANTOR: Blessed art thou, Lord God of our fathers
CHOIR: To be praised and glorified above all forever

CANTOR: Let us bless the Father, the Son, and the Holy Ghost
CHOIR: Let us praise Him and magnify Him forever

CANTOR: Blessed art thou, O Lord, in the firmament of Heaven
CHOIR: To be praised and glorified above all forever

CANTOR: The almighty and most merciful Lord guard us and give us his blessing
CHOIR: Amen

SPOKEN
READER: We confess
CHOIR: To God almighty, the Father, the Son, and the Holy Ghost, that we have sinned in thought, word, and deed, through our own grievous fault; wherefore we pray God to have mercy upon us.
Almighty God, have mercy upon us, forgive us all our sins, and deliver us from all evil; confirm and strengthen us in all goodness, and bring us to life everlasting, through Jesus Christ our Lord. Amen. 
READER: May the almighty and merciful Lord grant unto us pardon and remission of all our sins, time for amendment of life, and the grace and comfort of the Holy Spirit.  
CHOIR: Amen.

CHANTED
CANTOR: Wilt thou not turn again and quicken us
CHOIR: That thy people may rejoice in thee

CANTOR: O Lord, show thy mercy upon us
CHOIR: And grant us thy salvation

CANTOR: Vouchsafe, O Lord, to keep us this night without sin
CHOIR: O Lord, have mercy upon us, have mercy upon us.

CANTOR: O Lord, hear our prayer 
CHOIR: And let our cry come unto thee

CANTOR: Let us pray. 
[any other prayers or collects, still chanted]
CHOIR: Amen

CANTOR: Lighten our darkness, we beseech thee, O Lord, and by the great mercy defend us from all perils and dangers of this night, for the love of thy only Son, our savior, Jesus Christ.
CHOIR: Amen

 Anthem; announced and text read before singing

CHANTED/ SUNG
CANTOR:[chanted] We will lay us down in peace and take our rest
CHOIR:[sung] For it is thou, Lord, only, that makest us dwell in safety.

CANTOR:[chanted] The Lord be with you.
CHOIR:[sung] And with thy spirit.

CANTOR:[chanted] Let us bless the Lord.
CHOIR:[sung] Thanks be to God.

SPOKEN
READER: The almighty and merciful Lord, the Father, the Son, and the Holy Ghost, bless and preserve us. 
CHOIR: Amen.

Music Sung
The repertory of Compline Choir can be found in the online listing of weekly music presented. Generally (in addition to the standard liturgy) each week includes singing a new or different setting of the following: a psalm, a hymn, a Nunc dimittis, and an anthem.

Recordings and Available Performances
Archived recordings of Sunday evening services can be heard in podcast format. The radio station KING-FM broadcasts the service each week; this contributes to the precise timing of the start time. The Compline Choir also has made several recordings, which are available on CD.

 What Hand Divine (2015)
 I Will Meditate (2013)
 Carols Old and New (2006)
 Night Music (2001)
 Feathers of Green Gold: The Office of Compline and Ten Psalms (1994)

History of Compline Choir
The Compline Choir was formed in 1956 by Peter Hallock (Nov. 19, 1924 - Apr. 27, 2014). Hallock, who directed and composed for the choir, retired in 2009. Dr. Jason Anderson (a Compline Choir member since 2004) became the second director of the Compline Choir. The choir is made up of approximately 18 men. A video of a rehearsal is available online. Media articles about the choir are available from the New York Times, Seattle Post-Intelligencer and Seattle Weekly.

The Composer-in-Residence (since 2011) is Derek Curtis-Tilton.

Other Compline Choirs in the United States
Numerous compline choirs have been modeled after The Compline Choir at Saint Mark’s Cathedral. Examples include the Pittsburgh Compline Choir in Pittsburgh, conducted by Dr. Mark A. Boyle, currently offering compline each Sunday at Heinz Memorial Chapel, and the Minnesota Compline Choir in St. Paul, Minnesota, conducted by Adam Reinwald and offering compline once a month.  The Boys Choir at the Cathedral of All Saints (Albany, New York) also sings compline periodically, usually the first Friday of each month.
Episcopal Campus Ministry in Seattle also holds a Compline service at 9:30 on every Wednesday night of the academic year at Christ Episcopal Church in Seattle's University district.

Saint Mark’s Cathedral
Saint Mark's, Seattle is the cathedral church of the Episcopal Diocese of Olympia.  Saint Mark’s is also a parish church.

References

External links
 Compline Choir

American choirs